Louisiana's 21st State Senate district is one of 39 districts in the Louisiana State Senate. It has been represented by Republican Bret Allain since 2012.

Geography
District 21 covers all of St. Mary Parish and parts of Iberia, Lafourche, and Terrebonne Parishes along the Gulf of Mexico in Acadiana, including some or all of Thibodaux, Houma, Morgan City, Berwick, Patterson, Franklin, Baldwin, Bayou Vista, and Jeanerette.

The district overlaps with Louisiana's 1st, 3rd, and 6th congressional districts, and with the 46th, 49th, 50th, 51st, 52nd, 53rd, and 55th districts of the Louisiana House of Representatives.

Recent election results
Louisiana uses a jungle primary system. If no candidate receives 50% in the first round of voting, when all candidates appear on the same ballot regardless of party, the top-two finishers advance to a runoff election.

2019

2015

2011

Federal and statewide results in District 21

References

Louisiana State Senate districts
Iberia Parish, Louisiana
Lafourche Parish, Louisiana
St. Mary Parish, Louisiana
Terrebonne Parish, Louisiana